Liceo M.G.A. (which stands for "Maria Gaetana Agnesi") is a nationwide group of Italian high schools. The Liceos offer some of the most challenging courses in Europe, including Latin, Math, Italian, German, French, Technology, Architecture, and the History of Italian Arts. They usually require at least 5 hours of study a day, and the students attend school from 8.05 am to 1.05 pm with only a 15-minute break.

Major campuses
 "Liceo M.G.A. Merate" in Lecco Province: this campus one is one of the largest, with more than 6,000 students (both girls and boys).  Merate is a small town of only 14,000 people, but financing was provided by the city government. As the school is the only one of its type for many miles around, there was an immediate flood of applicants when the school opened. In two years, enrollment grew by 110%. 
 "Liceo M.G.A. Rome": this is a large school as well, with over 4,000 students.
 "Liceo M.G.A. Germania" in Germany: this school is in Berlin, but it is under Italian administration.
 "Liceo M.G.A. Etiopia" in Ethiopia: this school was built during the second World War, for the children of the Italian soldiers. It now has 3,000 students from all over Africa.

Schools in Italy